Pads Wood is a  biological Site of Special Scientific Interest west of Midhurst in West Sussex.

This ancient coppiced wood is mainly hazel and sweet chestnut with pedunculate oak and ash standards. The site has a rich lichen flora, most of which are epiphytic on the oak and ash standards, and a woodland ride has a rich display of flowering plants.

The site is private land with no public access.

References

Sites of Special Scientific Interest in West Sussex
Forests and woodlands of West Sussex